Victor Sablé (30 November 1911 in Fort-de-France, Martinique – 24 August 1997 in Nice, France) was a politician from Martinique who served in the French Senate from 1946-1948 and also the French National Assembly. His father was a lawyer's clerk, and he studied in Paris after graduating from the Lycée de Fort-de-France. He authored Les Antilles sans complexes: une expérience de décolonisation (1972), in which he recounted his political and governmental experiences in Paris.

References 
 
Victor Sablé page on the French Senate website

1911 births
1997 deaths
People from Fort-de-France
Martiniquais politicians
Radical Party (France) politicians
Independent Republicans politicians
Union for French Democracy politicians
French Senators of the Fourth Republic
Senators of Martinique
Deputies of the 1st National Assembly of the French Fifth Republic
Deputies of the 2nd National Assembly of the French Fifth Republic
Deputies of the 3rd National Assembly of the French Fifth Republic
Deputies of the 4th National Assembly of the French Fifth Republic
Deputies of the 5th National Assembly of the French Fifth Republic
Deputies of the 6th National Assembly of the French Fifth Republic
Deputies of the 7th National Assembly of the French Fifth Republic
MEPs for France 1979–1984